Goreville is a village in Johnson County, Illinois, United States. The population was 1,049 as of the 2010 census, up from 938 at the 2000 census.

Geography
Goreville is located in northwestern Johnson County at  (37.553212, -88.972783). It is bordered to the south by Ferne Clyffe State Park. Illinois Route 37 passes through the village, leading south  to Buncombe and north  to Interstate 57 at Exit 45, just north of that highway's interchange with Interstate 24.

Demographics

As of the census of 2000, there were 938 people, 392 households, and 286 families residing in the village. The racial makeup of the village was 98.61% White, 0.21% Native American, 0.11% Asian, 0.96% from other races, and 0.11% from two or more races. Hispanic or Latino of any race were 1.07% of the population.

There were 392 households, out of which 32.9% had children under the age of 18 living with them, 60.7% were married couples living together, 9.9% had a female householder with no husband present, and 26.8% were non-families. 25.5% of all households were made up of individuals, and 14.5% had someone living alone who was 65 years of age or older.  The average household size was 2.39 and the average family size was 2.83.

In the village, the population was spread out, with 24.2% under the age of 18, 7.7% from 18 to 24, 28.1% from 25 to 44, 21.9% from 45 to 64, and 18.1% who were 65 years of age or older.  The median age was 38 years. For every 100 females, there were 88.7 males.  For every 100 females age 18 and over, there were 87.6 males.

The median income for a household in the village was $33,750, and the median income for a family was $42,563. Males had a median income of $31,848 versus $21,786 for females. The per capita income for the village was $16,491.  About 8.1% of families and 12.2% of the population were below the poverty line, including 11.4% of those under age 18 and 14.2% of those age 65 or over.

References

Villages in Johnson County, Illinois
Villages in Illinois